Volleyball was contested for men only at the 1958 Asian Games in Komazawa Outdoor Volleyball Court, Tokyo, Japan.

Medalists

Volleyball

Nine-a-side volleyball

Medal table

Final standing

Volleyball

Nine-a-side volleyball

References
 Asian Games volleyball

 
1958 Asian Games events
1958
Asian Games
1958 Asian Games